El elegido (English: The Chosen) is an Argentine telenovela produced by El Árbol and aired by Telefe.

Cast

Main characters 
 Pablo Echarri as Andrés Bilbao
 Paola Krum as Mariana Estevez
 Leticia Brédice as Veronica San Martin (†)

Co-starring 
 Lito Cruz as Oscar Nevares Sosa
 Leonor Manso as María Bilbao (†)
 Patricio Contreras as Alfredo Bilbao (†)
 Mónica Antonópulos as Greta Sáenz Valiente
 Martín Seefeld as Santiago Mercado
 Jorge Suárez as Roberto Planes
 María Carámbula as Lucía Giuliani
 Luciano Cáceres as David Nevares Sosa (†)
 Lucrecia Capello as Silvia Escalada Blanco
 Ludovico Di Santo as Octavio Linares Calvo
 Calu Rivero as Érica Martínez
 Emilio Bardi as Alejandro Bilbao
 Paloma Contreras as Mariela Bilbao
 Paula Kohan as Giovana "Gigí" Gilardoni (†)
 María Dupláa as Jimena Estévez
 Maite Lanata as Alma Bilbao
 Daniel Fanego as Arturo Logroñeses

Special performance 
 Jorge D'Elía as Daniel Morbillo

Participations 
 Jorge Rivera López as Tomás
 Norberto Díaz as Dante Oviedo
 Ricardo Díaz Mourelle as Marcos Mariani (†)
 Fabio Aste as Jorge Pirra (†)
 Daniel Miglioranza as Rinaudo (†)
 Gabo Correa as Rogelio Rossi
 Julio Viera as Augusto (†)
 Catalina Artusi as Yessica "Colet" Álvarez
 Emilia Mazer as Julia
 Alfredo Castellani as Hassef
 Isabel Quinteros as Teresa
 María Ibarreta as Elena Ferrari
 Oscar Alegre as Miguel
 Jorge Sabaté as Mauricio Linares Calvo
 Lautaro Delgado as Carlos Gualtieri
 Cecilia Roth as Victoria Sucre
 Carlos Santamaría as Gonzalo Nievas (†)
 Lidia Catalano as Úrsula "Tita"
 Juan Luppi as Camilo
 Leonora Balcarce as Paloma Riccardi
 Cristina Tejedor as Laura Jin
 Roberto Vallejos as Rafael (†)
 Carlos Bermejo as Rómulo Rosales

Deaths
 Ricardo Estevez (Mariana's father)
 Papá de Veronica San Martin
 Jorge Pirra
 Gonzalo Nievas
 María Bilbao (Andres' mother)
 Alfredo Bilbao (Andres' father)
 Gigi (Greta's ex-girlfriend)
 David Nevares Sosa
 Arturo Logroñeses
 Rafael
 Veronica San Martin

International broadcasts 
  - Azteca América
  - Monte Carlo TV
  - Viva

References

External links
 Official website 

Argentine telenovelas
Spanish-language telenovelas
2011 telenovelas
Telefe telenovelas
2011 Argentine television series debuts
2011 Argentine television series endings